Written and illustrated by Naoki Urasawa, 20th Century Boys was originally serialized in Big Comic Spirits from 1999 to 2006. The 249 individual chapters were published into 22 tankōbon volumes by Shogakukan from January 29, 2000 to November 30, 2006. A sequel, titled 21st Century Boys, started in Big Comic Spiritss January 19, 2007 issue and ran until July. The 16 chapters were released into 2 volumes on May 30, 2007 and September 28, 2007. A one-shot manga titled Aozora Chu-Ihō ("Blue Sky Advisory — Kiss") was published in the February 2009 issue of Big Comic Spirits, it was credited to "Ujiko-Ujio", the pen-name of the fictional manga creator duo Kaneko and Ujiki in 20th Century Boys.

The manga was licensed for an English language release in North America by Viz Media in 2005, however their release was delayed until after their translation of Monster had finished. The first volume was released on February 17, 2009, and the last volume was released on September 18, 2012. The series was also released in Germany by Planet Manga, in France by Génération Comics, in Hong Kong by Jade Dynasty, in the Netherlands by Glénat, in Indonesia by Level Comics, in Italy by Planet Manga, in Poland by Hanami, in South Korea by Haksan Publishing, in Spain by Planeta DeAgostini, and in Taiwan by Tong Li Comics.

20th Century Boys

21st Century Boys

20th Century Boys: Ujiko Ujio's Mangari Michi

References

External links
 
 

20th Century Boys